Parastega is a genus of moth in the family Gelechiidae.

Species
 Parastega chionostigma (Walsingham, 1911)
 Parastega hemisigna Clarke, 1951
 Parastega niveisignella (Zeller, 1877)
 Parastega trichella Busck, 1914

References

Gelechiinae